Sayadaw U Paṇḍita (also Ovādācariya Sayādo Ū Paṇḍitābhivaṁsa; 28 July 1921 – 16 April 2016) was one of the foremost masters of Vipassanā. He trained in the Theravada Buddhist tradition of Myanmar. A successor to the late Mahāsi Sayādaw, he has taught many of the Western teachers and students of the Mahāsi style of Vipassanā meditation. He was the abbot of  Meditation Center in Yangon, Myanmar.

Early life and education
U Paṇḍita was born in 1921 in Insein in greater Rangoon (now Yangon) during British colonial rule. He became a novice at age twelve, and ordained at age twenty. After decades of study, he passed the rigorous series of government examinations in the Theravāda Buddhist texts, gaining the Dhammācariya (Dhamma teacher) degree in 1952.

U Paṇḍita began practicing Vipassana under the guidance of Mahāsi Sayādaw beginning in 1950.

Career
In 1955, he left his position as a teacher of scriptural studies to become a meditation teacher at the Mahāsi Meditation Center. Soon after Mahasi Sayādaw died in 1982, U Paṇḍita became the guiding teacher (Ovādacariya) of the Mahasi Meditation Center. In 1991, he left that position, founding  Meditation Center in Yangon. There are now  branch centers in Myanmar, Nepal, Australia, Singapore, the United Kingdom and the United States.

U Paṇḍita became well known in the West after conducting a retreat in the spring of 1984 at the Insight Meditation Society (IMS) in Barre, Massachusetts in the United States. Many of the senior Western meditation teachers in the Mahāsi tradition practiced with U Paṇḍita at that and subsequent retreats. The talks he gave in 1984 at IMS were compiled as the book In This Very Life.

Until his death at age 94 in 2016, he continued to lead retreats and give Dhamma talks, but he rarely gave interviews.

Method and style of teaching
U Paṇḍita was known for teaching a rigorous and precise method of self-examination. He taught  or Vipassanā, emphasizing Buddhist ethics as a requisite foundation. He was also an erudite scholar of the Pali , the Theravāda Canon.

Referred to by others
Judson Brewer a meditation researcher, uses Paṇḍita's quote to illustrate the difference between dopamine secretions and joy: "In their quest for happiness, people mistake excitement of the mind for real happiness."

Bibliography

References

Monasteries
Panditarama Shwe Taung Gon Sasana Yiktha
Panditarama Meditation Center near Yangon (archived)
Panditarama Lumbini International Vipassana Meditation Centre, Nepal
Tathagata Meditation Center, San Jose, California
Saddhamma Foundation
Panditarama Saraniya Dhamma Meditation Centre, Manchester, England

1921 births
2016 deaths
Theravada Buddhist monks
Burmese Theravada Buddhists
Burmese Buddhist monks
People from Yangon
Students of Mahasi Sayadaw